The Franklin & Marshall Diplomats football program represents Franklin & Marshall College in college football at the NCAA Division III level. The Diplomats have competed as members of the Centennial Conference since 1983 and play their home games at Shadek Stadium in Lancaster, Pennsylvania. John Troxell has served as the team's head coach since 2006.

Franklin & Marshall first formed a football team in 1887 and began playing other colleges in 1889. From 1889 to 1895, they were coached by team captains. Alfred E. Bull was hired in 1896 as Franklin & Marshall first professional coach.

Franklin & Marshall has won seven Centennial Conference titles: five under Tom Gilburg (1986, 1987, 1988, 1993, 1995), one under Shawn Halloran (2004), and one under Troxell (2017). The Diplomats have never appeared in the NCAA Division III Football Championship playoffs, but have played in 14 NCAA Division III bowl games.

References

External links
 

 
American football teams established in 1887
1887 establishments in Pennsylvania